Taharua is a rural community in the Taupō District and Hawke's Bay Region of New Zealand's North Island, located around the Ōamaru and Taharua Rivers, which are tributaries of the Mohaka River.

Demographics

Taharua statistical area had a population of 57 at the 2018 New Zealand census, unchanged since the 2013 census, and a decrease of 24 people (−29.6%) since the 2006 census. There were 30 households, comprising 36 males and 21 females, giving a sex ratio of 1.71 males per female. The median age was 34.2 years (compared with 37.4 years nationally), with 6 people (10.5%) aged under 15 years, 12 (21.1%) aged 15 to 29, 33 (57.9%) aged 30 to 64, and 6 (10.5%) aged 65 or older.

Ethnicities were 52.6% European/Pākehā, 26.3% Māori, 31.6% Asian, and 5.3% other ethnicities. People may identify with more than one ethnicity.

The percentage of people born overseas was 47.4, compared with 27.1% nationally.

Although some people chose not to answer the census's question about religious affiliation, 52.6% had no religion, 42.1% were Christian, and 5.3% had Māori religious beliefs.

Of those at least 15 years old, 6 (11.8%) people had a bachelor's or higher degree, and 6 (11.8%) people had no formal qualifications. The median income was $43,200, compared with $31,800 nationally. 9 people (17.6%) earned over $70,000 compared to 17.2% nationally. The employment status of those at least 15 was that 39 (76.5%) people were employed full-time,and 3 (5.9%) were part-time.

References

Taupō District
Populated places in the Hawke's Bay Region